is a Japanese singer, actress, fashion model, and former member of the Japanese idol group AKB48, in which she was the captain of Team A.

Career 
In October 2005, she auditioned for AKB48's first generation roster but failed the audition. Shortly after her audition, Shinoda began working AKB48's theater café – then known as Akihabara 48 – as a café attendant serving customers and handing out promotional flyers on the street.  Shinoda became quite popular among patrons who soon learned of her failing her audition.  To show their support, patrons began submitting her name on hand-written ballots for the weekly performer polls. Yasushi Akimoto, general producer of AKB48, took notice of her popularity and gave her a chance to join AKB48 on the condition that she learn the group's 12 songs and dances in four days. She became AKB48's first non-generation, or "1.5 generation", member with her debut on Team A on 22 January 2006. Her first single as part of the main group was on "Aitakatta".
On 30 March 2011, she began to host a show with her own name,  on NHK. She has appeared individually in television commercials and was cited  as the "queen of TV commercials" (CM joō) for 2012 for having more contracts (a total of 20) with companies to appear in their ads than any other female tarento (fellow AKB48 member Tomomi Itano was tied at 20).

In August 2012, AKB48 Theater's manager Tomonobu Togasaki announced sweeping team changes that placed Shinoda as the new captain of Team A.

In 2013, Shinoda launched her clothing brand "ricori" which featured clothing that she had designed and produced. She stated that starting her own line of clothing had been a dream of hers before joining AKB48. In July 2014, ricori ceased operation and closed down its stores. Shinoda stated she was working as an adviser for the label only until 2013.

Shinoda placed fifth overall in the 2013 AKB48 General Election. On 8 June, during the broadcast of the election results, Shinoda announced that she would be leaving the group. Her graduation ceremony was held on 21 July at the Fukuoka PayPay Dome, and her final performance at the AKB48 theater was on 22 July.

On 24 January 2016, Shinoda appeared as the lead actress in Korean rapper Zico's 'It Was Love' music video. He sang the song with Luna, the main vocalist of South Korean girl group f(x).

On 20 February 2019 Shinoda announced her marriage on Instagram to a non-celebrity man working in the business industry. The couple was engaged after only a few months of dating and got married on 16 February 2019. 
On April 1, 2020, Shinoda's mother announced on her Instagram that Mariko gave birth to a daughter named Mei.

Discography

AKB48 main singles

Other AKB48 singles 
 "Dareka no Tame ni – What can I do for someone?" (2011)
 "Sugar Rush" (2012)

Events 
 Tokyo Girls Collection (2009–2010)
 Kobe Collection (2011)
 Girls Award (2012–2013)
 Kansai Collection (2013–2014)
 Tokyo Runway (2014)
 Fukuoka Asia Collection (2014)

Stage units 
A listing of Shinoda's participation in AKB48's theatre programs, called stages:
 2005–2006: Team A 1st Stage: 
 small group songs: "Kiss wa Dameyo (2nd unit)
 2006: Team A 2nd Stage: 
 small group songs: "Namida no Shōnan", "Senaka Kara Dakishimete", "Rio no Kakumei"
 2006–2007: Team A 3rd Stage: 
 small group songs: "Bird" and "Seifuku ga Jama o Suru"
 2007, 2008: Team A 4th Stage: 
 small group songs: "Kikyō"
 2007: Himawari-gumi 1st Stage: 
 small group songs: "Himawari"
 2007–2008: Himawari-gumi 2nd Stage: 
 small group songs "Confession"
 2008–2010: Team A 5th Stage: 
 small group songs: "Manatsu no Christmas Rose"
 2010–2012: Team A 6th Stage: 
 small group songs "Saboten to Gold Rush"
 2012–2013: Team A 1st Waiting Stage
 Shonichi subgroup, small group songs "Kuroi Tenshi"

Filmography

Films

Dramas

Television

Dubbing 
In Time, Sylvia Weis (Amanda Seyfried)

Bibliography
 Mariko no Orikousama! (Poplar Publishing, October 2011) 
 Shinoda Mariko no 150-ji de Kotaenasai (Ascom, November 2011)

Magazines
 More, Shueisha 1977–, as an exclusive model since September 2008

Photobooks
 Pendulum (Wani Books, August 2008) 
 Super Mariko (Wani Books, 27 May 2009) 
 Mariko (Shueisha, 2 July 2010)
 MARIKO magazine (Shueisha, 28 October 2011) 
 IQueen Vol.10 Shinoda Mariko (Plup Series, 27 July 2012) 
 Yes and No Mariko Shinoda (Shueisha, 28 November 2012)

Notes

References

External links 
  

AKB48 members
Japanese idols
Actors from Fukuoka Prefecture
Sony Music Entertainment Japan artists
Living people
Japanese female models
Japanese fashion designers
1986 births
Musicians from Fukuoka Prefecture
People from Itoshima, Fukuoka
21st-century Japanese actresses
Models from Fukuoka Prefecture
21st-century Japanese women singers
21st-century Japanese singers
Japanese women fashion designers